Big Rig were a punk band formed in the San Francisco Bay Area in 1993. Singer/songwriter Jesse Michaels fronted the group after the breakup of his previous band, Operation Ivy. Big Rig played only one show during their brief existence as a band. The band's sole release is the EP Expansive Heart, released in 1994 on Lookout Records. Big Rig broke up in 1993, only a few months after they formed.

Members
Jesse Michaels – vocals 
Doug Sangalang – guitar 
Kevin Cross – guitar 
Jeremy Goody – bass 
Brandon Riggen – drums

Discography

Extended plays

References

External links
 Fan Site
Lookout! Records

Musical groups from California